The following lists events that happened during 1991 in the Grand Duchy of Luxembourg.

Incumbents

Events

January – March
 1 January – Luxembourg assumes the rotating Presidency of the Council of the European Union for the following six months.
 2 February – Fernand Franck is ordained as the new Archbishop of Luxembourg.
 2 March – SES launches its second satellite, Astra 1B.
 25 March – The commune of Berg is renamed 'Colmar-Berg'.

April – June
 4 May – Representing Luxembourg, Sarah Bray finishes fourteenth in the Eurovision Song Contest 1991 with the song Un baiser volé.
 16 June – The Netherlands' Gert-Jan Theunisse wins the 1991 Tour de Luxembourg.
 28–29 June – Luxembourg hosts its meeting of the European Council, at which the draft Treaty of Maastricht is considered.

July – September
 27 July – Rights to freedom of expression traditionally associated with print media are explicitly guaranteed with regard to electronic media.

October – December
 October – RTL broadcasts the first ever daily news programme in Luxembourgish.
 1 November – Jean Dupong is appointed President of the Council of State.

Births
 16 February – Princess Alexandra of Luxembourg

Deaths
 18 June – Tony Bourg, writer
 10 October – Adrien Ries, economist
 21 December – Jempi Kemmer, composer

Footnotes

References